Beckley Airport may refer to:

Beckley Raleigh County Memorial Airport
Springfield-Beckley Municipal Airport